Charlotte Wilhelmine Christiane Marie of Hesse-Darmstadt (5 November 1755, Darmstadt – 12 December 1785, Hanover), was by marriage Duchess of Mecklenburg-Strelitz.

Life 
Charlotte was a daughter of Prince George William of Hesse-Darmstadt (1722-1782) from his marriage to Countess Maria Louise Albertine of Leiningen-Falkenburg-Dagsburg (1729-1818), daughter of Count Christian Karl Reinhard of Leiningen-Dachsburg-Falkenburg-Heidesheim.

The princess was first engaged with the hereditary prince Peter Frederick William of Oldenburg, but the engagement was dissolved again as a result of the onset of Peter's mental illness.

Charlotte married Charles of Mecklenburg-Strelitz (who later became the Duke of Mecklenburg-Strelitz), on 28 September 1784 in Darmstadt.  He was previously married to Charlotte's older sister Friederike, who had died in childbirth.  She thus became stepmother for her sister's five surviving children - her nieces and nephews.

The couple lived in Hanover, where Charles served as Governor-General for his brother-in-law, King George.  Charlotte died after the birth of her only child, a year after their marriage. Charles resigned from his post in Hanover and moved to Charlotte's mother in Darmstadt, who then took care of his children (both Frederike's and Charlotte's).

Offspring 
Her only child from her marriage to Charles was:
 Charles (1785-1837), General and President of the Prussian State Council

Ancestry

References 

  Carl Friedrich Günther: Anecdotes, character descriptions and memoirs from the Hessian area ..., p. 172 
 Political Journal, p. 1274
 Luise Schorn-Schütte: Queen Louise, p. 12

Deaths in childbirth
House of Hesse-Darmstadt
1755 births
1785 deaths
Landgravines of Hesse-Darmstadt